The Baptistery of Parma is a religious edifice in Parma, northern Italy. Architecturally, the baptistery of Parma Cathedral  marks a transition between the Romanesque and Gothic styles, and it is considered to be among the most important Medieval monuments in Europe.

Description 

The city council of Parma commissioned Benedetto Antelami to build the baptistery in 1196. The outside of pink Verona marble is octagonal. The inside contains sixteen arches, forming alcoves each containing a painted scene. All these are 13th and 14th century frescoes and paintings. The most striking part of the Baptistery, however, is its painted domed ceiling. Sixteen rays come out of the center of the ceiling, which each correspond to the arches.

However, problems were posed over time as the paintings were not true frescoes. The paint would start to come off the walls and would be literally hanging on. Due to this, the Baptistery had to be painstakingly consolidated and restored with syringes and spatulas.

See also 
Baptistery
Cathedral of Parma
Parma
History of medieval Arabic and Western European domes

External links 

A short clip of the Baptistery.

12th-century Roman Catholic church buildings in Italy
Octagonal buildings in Italy
Parma
Roman Catholic churches in Parma
Gothic architecture in Emilia-Romagna
Romanesque architecture in Parma
Baptisteries in Italy